Early European personifications of America, meaning the Americas, typically come from sets of the Four continents: Europe, Asia, Africa, and America. These were all that were then known in Europe.  The addition of America made these an even more attractive group to represent visually, as sets of four could be placed around all sorts of four-sided objects, or in pairs along the facade of a building with a central doorway.

A set of loose conventions quickly arose as to the iconography of the personifications. They were normally female, with Europe queenly and grandly dressed, and clearly the leader of the group.  Asia is fully and richly dressed but in an exotic style, with Africa and America at most half-dressed, and given exotic props.  One of the earliest and most persistent attributes for America was the parrot; these reached Europe by the early 16th century and were highly valued.  The feather crown headdress, with the feathers standing up vertically, reflected the actual headgear of some American peoples.  A cornucopia, representing the new edible plants from the Americas, was a very common feature (although the familiar apple often seems the most prominent).  America is often accompanied by an improbably placid caiman or alligator, reasonably comparable to Old World crocodiles, though the earliest images may show an exotic armadillo.

The pattern for Early Modern depictions was set by reports from Central and South America, and largely remained in place until some way into the 19th century, when European contact with North American Native Americans became more prominent.  In the 18th century, British America began to use personifications based on Britannia and Liberty, as well as Columbia, something of a combination of these.  As more new nations became independent in the Americas, new national personifications were adopted.

European images

The addition of America to the previous three continents or "parts of the world" was not immediate after 1492, as it took some years to establish that America was not an eastern edge of Asia, and was a very large land mass comparable to the others. The very notion of a continent was uncertain, and contemporary intellectuals tried to integrate the newly-discovered lands into the already complicated and disputed picture of world geography inherited from the Ancient Greeks.    

Some of the earliest recorded personifications came from the court of Cosimo I de' Medici, Grand Duke of Tuscany in Florence.  Although not at all involved in the exploration of the Americas (the Habsburgs had by the 1520s made it very difficult for any Italians to travel there), the Medicis were very interested in them, and had acquired a good collection of artifacts, plants, and animals. For Cosimo's politically important wedding to Eleanor of Toledo, a distant cousin of Charles V, in 1539, the lavish street decorations for the procession included images of Charles with personifications of Spain, New Spain and Peru. No images survive, but the official festival book has text descriptions, although they had clearly not been explained properly to the author. He says the naked New Spain held a "pine cone", no doubt intended to be a pineapple, and Peru "had with her a sheep with a long neck" – a llama. Charles's own wedding procession in 1526 in Seville had included representations of American Indians.  

Such images as bows and arrows, clubs, and indications of cannibalism would be closely intertwined with the artistic conception of the Americas as a reflection of the idealization of America as a place of savagery and tropical wilderness. At this time, America personified predominantly possessed elements associated with hot, tropical environs because of the regions of the Americas that had been explored first. These explored regions were mainly the tropical regions of Central and South America.

Depictions of America included exotic background details, especially fauna unknown in Europe such as "the parrot or macaw, turtle, armadillo, tapir, sloth, jaguar, and alligator."  However, the tattoos worn by both sexes, which astonished early writers, were omitted by artists based in Europe, though drawn by travelers.  They may have been thought indecorous on female personifications. 

While Europe possessed the image of a noble or a Roman goddess, America "was usually envisioned as a rather fierce savage – only slightly removed in type from the medieval tradition of the wild man." This is not to suggest that only America was radically different from Europe in terms of the figure’s appearance. Outside of personification, Asia took a dramatically different appearance from Europe. This is seen in the print The Entry of the Ambassador of Persia into Paris, Seen in the Place Royal, 7 February 1715. Coming from the “very exotic kingdom of Persia,” the plate depicts the Persian diplomat Mohammed Reza Beg with his entourage, almost all men with turbans, moustaches, distinctive noses, and robes, some bearing falchions. This does, however, argue that America was perhaps iconographically the most antithetical continent to Europe in most sets of the continents personified.

This disparity between the two continents is especially poignant in the continental personifications at the staircase in Würzburg. There, Europe is seen, in accordance with Ripa’s depiction, as being the most nobly clad, in addition to being surrounded by relics of art, science, and the church. This is opposed by the depiction of America as naked, dressed in feathers, with a feathered crown, a bow, a parrot perched on her wrist, accompanied by a pile of heads. In addition to these disparate degrees of civility in their depictions, here Europe and America are shown to be in a direct relationship of religious superiority and subservience. In describing the Americas in terms of religious potential with regards to the paintings at Würzburg, it was argued about America that “One of the foremost connotations of this new world was religious, and specifically missionary.”

In spite of the predominant conception of America personified as being a half-clad woman wearing feathers, holding a bow, and having a large reptile at her side and a disembodied head at her feet, not all images of America were made strictly in accordance with what was essentially Ripa’s template for the continental personifications, nor did the cultural elements or wildlife depicted always stand up to what America’s reality actually was. Indeed, as time went on, instead of familiarity breeding authenticity in depictions, artistic license became even more rampant. “As the New World became less threatening to Europeans, its personification grew softer, more decorative, more Arcadian. Amazons gave way to graceful young women, whom the European taste for exoticism endowed with an ever more voluptuous appeal.”  By virtue of this, the depiction of America as a wild savage shifted into being a noble savage, or "Indian princess."

In other, less politically-charged respects, there were also inconsistencies in America’s portrayal, particularly with the sort of animals accompanying her. Often Africa and America were confused, with their conventional attributes being swapped around; presumably this was because both were considered hot and exotic.  America has been shown with a number of animals not naturally found on the American continents. America is shown with a camel in a set of glasses, and a depiction of a woman with an elephant had been labelled “America” for many years. These inaccuracies were encompassed in a larger conundrum of America and Africa being allowed to share iconography, even within the same context, as in one instance where America’s and Africa’s personifications are portrayed as children in the act of playing with each other.

Early North American images
The first personification images made by Europeans settled in America included some versions of the European types, including engravings by Paul Revere, but such European-Americans were not long happy being symbolised by Native Americans, with whom they were often at war.  Before independence they had already begun to use figures combining aspects of Britannia and Liberty, and after it quickly dropped the former. The figures were now sometimes called "America" and sometimes "Liberty", later mostly settling on the latter.  Through most of the 19th century American coins carried a neoclassical female head labelled "Liberty".  Although Columbia was in literary use from around 1730, she does not seem to have been used in images until later, around 1800.

See also
Europa regina

Notes

References
 Haase, Wolfgang and Reinhold, Meyer (eds.), The Classical Tradition and the Americas: European Images of the Americas and the Classical Tradition (Vol. 1 of 2), 1994, Walter de Gruyter, 9783110115727. .
 Higham, John (1990). "Indian Princess and Roman Goddess: The First Female Symbols of America", Proceedings of the American Antiquarian Society. 100: 50–51, JSTOR or PDF
 Le Corbeiller, Clare, "Miss America and Her Sisters: Personifications of the Four Parts of the World", The Metropolitan Museum of Art Bulletin, vol. 19, pp. 210–223, PDF
 Markey, Lia, Imagining the Americas in Medici Florence, 2016, Penn State Press, 9780271078229. .

Further reading

 Honour, Hugh, The New Golden Land: European images of America from the discoveries to the present time, 1976, Allen Lane

Iconography
Americas
America
Americas